The 1940 Bournemouth by-election was held on 27 June 1940.  The by-election was held due to the elevation to the peerage of the incumbent Conservative MP, Henry Page Croft.  It was won by the Conservative candidate Leonard Lyle, who was uncontested.

Results

References 

1940 elections in the United Kingdom
1940 in England
20th century in Hampshire
June 1940 events
Politics of Bournemouth
By-elections to the Parliament of the United Kingdom in Hampshire constituencies
By-elections to the Parliament of the United Kingdom in Dorset constituencies
Unopposed by-elections to the Parliament of the United Kingdom (need citation)